Saiyed Sarawan is a large village in Muratganj Block in Chail panchayat, Kaushambi district, Uttar Pradesh, India.

References

Villages in Kaushambi district